2008 Dutch Open may refer to:

 2008 Dutch Open (tennis)
 2008 Dutch Open (darts)